Pete Townshend Live: A Benefit for Maryville Academy (Platinum 9555) is a 1998 live album by English rock musician Pete Townshend, member of The Who, recorded at the House of Blues in Chicago. It was produced by multi-instrumentalist Jon Carin, who gives this album a special feel with the use of programmed drums and samples. Covers many Who songs and some solo material. A "bonus CD" features 2 tracks with Eddie Vedder, Pearl Jam's vocalist.

It was released by Platinum Entertainment, licensed by The Who's charity, Double O Promotions Limited and all artist royalties benefit the Roman Catholic Chicago-based institution Maryville Academy, "a leader in the treatment of physically, sexually, and emotional abused children. It provides a safe, secure, and stable environment where these youngsters can regain the hope they lost so long ago and begin the healing process".

Track listing 

Bonus CD

(Tracks on disc 2 come from the Maryville Academy benefit show performed at the HOB on 14 June 1997.)

Performers 
Disc 1
Pete Townshend - vocals, electric and acoustic guitars
Jon Carin - keyboards, drum tracks, sequencer, vocals
Peter Hope-Evans - mouth organ, Jew's harp
Jody Linscott - percussion
Chucho Merchán - double bass, plus additional percussion on Now and Then
Tracey Langran - hi-string guitar, vocals

Disc 2
Pete Townshend - vocals, guitar
Eddie Vedder - vocals
Jon Carin - keyboards, vocals

External links 
Maryville Academy New Website
Townshend's site
Platinum CD

1998 live albums
Pete Townshend live albums